Shelbiana is an unincorporated community and coal town in Pike County, Kentucky, United States. 

Facts about Shelbiana:

It houses the CSX railroad yard (formerly Chessie System, C & O, B & O), the second largest railroad yard in the state of Kentucky. Coal originating in this yard was shipped to multiple states and a few foreign countries.

The Shelbiana post office was located near the railroad yard until the late 1990s when US 23 was rerouted and land to build a new facility was made available near the community of Ford’s Branch. Glima Bea Slone Allen was the postmaster for a number of years until her retirement in the early 1980s. She died in 2018, two months shy of her 100th birthday. Today this location serves 2,807 Shelbiana residents with a median income of $31,797. It's estimated that approximately 4,480 packages pass through this post office each year.

Before disbanding, the Ringing Brothers and Barnam Bailey Circus would stop on their train while heading to their winter home in Jacksonville Florida and stage impromptu performances for local residence free of charge. 

During the Christmas season, the Santa Clause train would pass through as it made its rounds through Appalachia delivering presents to underprivileged children in the area. 

Communities in the area included Back Bottom, Greasy Creek, Ford’s Branch, Dry Fork, School House Hill, and the Knoll. The YMCA served the communities in Shelbiana until its closure in the late 1990s.

References

Unincorporated communities in Pike County, Kentucky
Coal towns in Kentucky
Unincorporated communities in Kentucky

https://postofficeshours.com/ky/shelbiana/shelbiana